Olav Magnar Odden (28 September 1914 – 28 January 1969) was a Norwegian skier from Folldal. He competed in cross-country skiing and Nordic combined at the 1948 Winter Olympics.

He was Norwegian champion in 30 km in 1938 and a winner in Nordic combined in Holmenkollen in 1946.

Cross-country skiing results

Olympic Games

World Championships

References

External links

1914 births
1969 deaths
People from Folldal
Norwegian male cross-country skiers
Norwegian male Nordic combined skiers
Olympic cross-country skiers of Norway
Olympic Nordic combined skiers of Norway
Cross-country skiers at the 1948 Winter Olympics
Nordic combined skiers at the 1948 Winter Olympics
Sportspeople from Innlandet
20th-century Norwegian people